Samuel Bevier House is a historic home located near Garrett in Keyser Township, DeKalb County, Indiana.  It was built in 1905, and is a two-story, cast stone Colonial Revival style dwelling with Queen Anne massing. It has a two bay porch supported by cast stone Tuscan order columns.

It was added to the National Register of Historic Places in 1983.

References

Houses on the National Register of Historic Places in Indiana
Queen Anne architecture in Indiana
Colonial Revival architecture in Indiana
Houses completed in 1905
Houses in DeKalb County, Indiana
National Register of Historic Places in DeKalb County, Indiana
1905 establishments in Indiana